Leonidas Christodoulou (Greek: Λούης Χριστοδούλου; born 7 August 1967) is an Australian former soccer player who is last known to have played as a midfielder for West Adelaide.

Career

In 1987, Christodoulou signed for Panathinaikos, one of Greece's most successful clubs.

Before the second half of 1997/98, he signed for West Adelaide in Australia.

References

External links
 Louis Christodoulou at OzFootball

Australian soccer players
Living people
Expatriate footballers in Greece
Panathinaikos F.C. players
Australian people of Greek descent
Australian expatriate soccer players
Association football midfielders
1967 births
National Soccer League (Australia) players
West Adelaide SC players
Soccer players from Adelaide